Friedrich-Wilhelm Neumann (22 January 1889 – 26 January 1975) was a German general during World War II who held several divisional and corps level commands. He was a recipient of the Knight's Cross of the Iron Cross.

Awards and decorations

 Knight's Cross of the Iron Cross on 16 October 1944 as Generalleutnant and commander of 712. Infanterie-Division

References

Citations

Bibliography

1889 births
1975 deaths
German Army personnel of World War I
Lieutenant generals of the German Army (Wehrmacht)
People from Osterode am Harz
People from the Province of Hanover
Recipients of the clasp to the Iron Cross, 1st class
Recipients of the Knight's Cross of the Iron Cross
Military personnel from Lower Saxony
German Army generals of World War II